This is a list of universities in Kyrgyzstan, ordered alphabetically by location.

Chüy Region
Al-Tamimi Bachelor Clinical University

. Bishkek International Medical Institute
 Academy of Arts of the Kyrgyz Republic (AAKR)
 Academy of the Ministry of Internal Affairs of the Kyrgyz Republic (AIAMKR)
 International Medical University (IMU) 
Academy of Sports institute (KIPEs)
 American University of Central Asia (AUCA) (previously American University of Kyrgyzstan)
 Beyshenalieva Kyrgyz Art Institute (BKAI)
 Bishkek Humanities University
 Bishkek State Economic and Commercial Institute (BSECI)
 Filiale des Goethe Instituts
 Institute of Management, Business and Tourism (IMBT) 
 International Academy of Management, Law, Finance and Business
 Ala-Too International University 
 International Higher School of Medicine, International University of Kyrgyzstan Academic Consortium
 International University of Central Asia (IUCA) 
 International University of Innovative Technologies 
 International University of Kyrgyzstan (IUK)
 International University of Science and Business (IUSB or MUNIB)
 Eastern University named after Mahmud Kashgari Barskani
 Keiin International Institute
 Kyrgyz Academy of Agriculture (KAA)
 Kyrgyz Economic University, named after M. Ryskulbekov (KEU)
 Kyrgyz Institute of Physical Education and Sports (KIPES)
 Kyrgyz International Universal College (KIUC) 
 Kyrgyz Mining and Metallurgical Institute (KMMI)
 Kyrgyz National Agrarian University (KNAU) 
 Kyrgyz National Conservatory (KNC)
 Kyrgyz National University, named after Jusup Balasagyn (KNU)
 Kyrgyz-Russian Slavic University
 Medical Faculty, Kyrgyz Russian Slavic University (KRSU)
 Kyrgyz State Medical Academy (KSMA) 
 Kyrgyz State University of Arabaev (KSUA)
 Kyrgyz State University of Construction, Transportation and Architecture (KSUCTA)
 Kyrgyz Technical University
 Kyrgyz University of Languages and Culture (KULC) 
 Kyrgyz-Uzbek University (K-UU)
 Manas University (Kyrgyz Turkish Manas University- KTMU)
 Tokmok Technical University

Issyk-Kul
 Issyk-Kul State University (I-KSU)

Jalal-Abad
 Jalal-Abad State University 
 University of Economy and Enterprise
 Modern University Of Kyrgyzstan

Naryn

 Naryn State University (NSU)
 University of Central Asia (UCA)

Osh
International Medical Faculty, Osh State University
 Kyrgyz State Medical Institute of Postgraduate Education – south branch 
 Kyrgyz-Uzbek University  (KUU)
 Osh High College (OHC)
 Osh State University (OSU)
 Osh State University – Medical Institute 
 Osh Technological University (OTU)

References

External links
 List of universities in Kyrgyzstan
 International School of Medicine on http://admissions.kg International School of Medicine IUK details on Admission to medical university in Kyrgyzstan – Study MD (MBBS)
 International School of Medicine courses on http://admissions.kg International School of Medicine IUK courses details on Admission to medical university in Kyrgyzstan – Study MD (MBBS)
 International University of Science and Business (Mezhdunarodnyy Universitet Nauki i Biznesa) www.munib.org 5 year MD/MBBS;3 year Nursing

 *
Universities
Kyrgyzstan
Kyrgyzstan